Sidewinder is a vertically scrolling shooter developed by Arcadia Systems and published by Mastertronic in 1988.

Reception
Computer Gaming Worlds Chuck Miller reported in June 1994 that Raptor: Call of the Shadows was the first action game to be as addictive for him as Sidewinder on the Amiga in 1988.

References

External links 
 
 Game entry at HOL

1988 video games
Arcade video games
Mastertronic games
Amiga games
Atari ST games
Vertically scrolling shooters
Single-player video games